Jerome Carter (born March 25, 1963) is an American retired high jumper.

He won the bronze medal at the 1987 Pan American Games. He competed at the 1987 World Championships without reaching the final. He set the American Record in the high jump with a personal best of 2.37 meters (7' 9 1/2") in May 1988.

His personal best jump is 2.37 metres, achieved in May 1988 in Columbus, Ohio.

References
 

1963 births
Living people
American male high jumpers
Pan American Games bronze medalists for the United States
Pan American Games medalists in athletics (track and field)
Athletes (track and field) at the 1987 Pan American Games
Medalists at the 1987 Pan American Games